Robert F. Brauneis is a professor of intellectual property law at the George Washington University Law School.

Biography
Brauneis received a B.A. from the University of California, Santa Cruz in 1982, and a J.D., magna cum laude from Harvard Law School in 1989. He then served as a law clerk to Judge Stephen Breyer of the United States Court of Appeals for the First Circuit, and then to Justice David Souter of the Supreme Court of the United States from 1992 to 1993. Between his clerkships, he worked as an Assistant Corporation Counsel for the city of Chicago. In August 1994, he joined the faculty of George Washington University Law School.

He is most noted for his article, Copyright and the World's Most Popular Song, which provided the evidence used to determine that the longstanding claim to copyright ownership of the song, Happy Birthday to You, was invalid. Brauneis has also published many other articles, and contributed to the authorship of several books.

See also
 List of law clerks of the Supreme Court of the United States (Seat 3)

References

Selected publications
 Brauneis, Robert; Schechter, Roger (2012). Copyright: A Contemporary Approach. Interactive Casebook Series. St. Paul, MN:  West Academic Publishing 
 Brauneis, Robert (1996). "The Foundation of our 'Regulatory Takings' Jurisprudence: The Myth and Meaning of Justice Holmes' Opinion in Pennsylvania Coal v. Mahon." Yale Law Journal 106: 613–702. (JSTOR access).

External links
 Biography at the George Washington University Law School
 Blog posts at Volokh Conspiracy
 Statement of Robert Brauneis, Committee on the Judiciary, U.S. House of Representatives, February 26, 2015

Living people
Place of birth missing (living people)
Year of birth missing (living people)
Harvard Law School alumni
University of California, Santa Cruz alumni
George Washington University Law School faculty
Law clerks of the Supreme Court of the United States
20th-century American lawyers
21st-century American lawyers
Lawyers from Washington, D.C.
Copyright scholars
American legal scholars